I'm Still in Love with You is the fifth studio album by the American gospel and soul singer Al Green, released on October 23, 1972, on Hi Records. Recording sessions took place during 1972. The album was produced solely by Willie Mitchell. The album peaked at number four on the US Billboard 200 and number one on the US Top R&B/Hip-Hop Albums and produced four singles: "Love and Happiness" which was rated ninety-eight on [[Rolling Stone's 500 Greatest Songs of All Time|Rolling Stones'''s 500 Greatest Songs of All Time]] as well as "I'm Still in Love with You" and "Look What You Done for Me" which were top five hits on the US Pop Chart. In 2003, the album was ranked number 285 on the 500 greatest albums of all time by Rolling Stone, 286 in a 2012 revised list, and number 306 in a 2020 revised list. The introductory drum break to the album's second track, "I'm Glad You're Mine", was sampled by The Notorious B.I.G. in his later-posthumous single "Dead Wrong".

 Track listing 

 Personnel 
Credits for I'm Still in Love with You'' adapted from Allmusic

Pam Brady – assistant
Tom Cartwright – project director
Charles Chalmers – arranger, horn arrangements, string arrangements, backing vocals
Sandra Chalmers – background vocals
Robert Gordon – liner notes
Al Green – lead vocals
Howard Grimes – drums, rhythm section
Jack Hale, Sr. – horn section, trombone
Charles Hodges – drums, organ, piano
Leroy Hodges – bass
Mabon "Teenie" Hodges – guitar
Al Jackson Jr. – drums

Wayne Jackson – horn section, trumpet
Ed Logan – tenor horn, tenor saxophone 
Andrew Love – tenor horn, tenor saxophone
James Mitchell – string and horn arrangements, tenor horn, baritone saxophone
Willie Mitchell – engineer, producer
Eli Okun – reissue producer
Bud O'Shea – reissue producer
Cheryl Pawelski – assistant
Donna Rhodes – backing vocals
Sandra Rhodes – backing vocals
Larry Walsh – mastering
Pete Welding – assistant

Charts

Certifications

See also
List of number-one R&B albums of 1972 (U.S.)

References

1972 albums
Al Green albums
Albums produced by Willie Mitchell (musician)
Hi Records albums